The Cross of Saint George is a state decoration of the Russian Federation.  It was initially established by Imperial Russia where it was officially known as the Decoration of the Military Order of Saint George between 1807 and 1913. The Cross of Saint George was reinstated into the Russian awards system in 1992.

History 1807–1917
Established in the February 1807 decree of Emperor Alexander I, it was intended as a reward for "undaunted courage" by the lower ranks (soldiers, sailors and NCOs) of the military.  Article four of the decree ordered the decoration to hang from the same ribbon as the Order of Saint George. There was only a single class with no restriction as to the number of awards per person.

The first soldier to be awarded the Cross of Saint George was a cavalry non-commissioned officer named Yegor Ivanovich Mitrokhin. He received the award for distinction in the battle against the French at Friedland on 2 June 1807.

Numbering of the crosses on the reverse began in January 1809, conversely, a register of the awards was also started that same year. By this time, approximately 10,000 crosses had already been awarded. By the beginning of the War of 1812 (French invasion of Russia), 16,833 crosses had been produced by the mint. Statistics of awards over the first years is detailed below:

 1812: 6,783 awarded
 1813: 8,611 awarded
 1814: 9,345 awarded
 1815: 3,983 awarded
 1816: 2,682 awarded
 1817: 659 awarded
 1818: 328 awarded
 1819: 189 awarded

An 1856 royal decree divided the decoration into four classes. A person initially received the fourth class and would subsequently be promoted to higher classes for further acts of bravery; one who received all four classes was called a "Full Cavalier of Saint George". The first and second classes were made of gold, the third and fourth were made of silver.  The numbering on the reverse began anew for each class of the decoration.

A 1913 royal decree officialized the name "Cross of Saint George" and the numbering began anew.  In 1915, due to war shortages, the first and second class decorations were made of lower grade gold (60 percent gold, 39.5 percent silver, 0.5 percent copper).  The third and fourth class decorations were produced in the same 99 percent silver. There were 26,950 first class crosses (No. 5531 to No. 32,840) and 52,900 second class crosses (No. 65,030 to No. 12,131) produced in low-grade gold. Approximate number of St. George Crosses awarded from 1914 to 1917:

 1st class: 33,000
 2nd class: 65,000
 3rd class: 289,000
 4th class: 1.2 million

"1M" was used in the serial number to indicate the number one million.  On 10 September 1916, the Highest Council of Ministers approved a change to the St George Cross removing the gold and silver from its making. They began to mint crosses made of "yellow metal" (JM) and of "white metal" (BM).  The crosses first and second class, made of yellow metal had the letters "JM" (Russian "ЖМ") above the serial number, the crosses second and third class, made of white metal had the letters "BM" (Russian "БМ") above the serial number. The number of crosses produced for each class in "JM" and "BM":

 1st class JM 10,000: No. 32,481 to No. 42,480
 2nd class JM 20,000: No. 65,031 to No. 85,030
 3rd class MB 49,500: No. 289,151 to No. 338,650
 4th class MB 89,000: No. 1,210,151 to No. 1,299,150

In 1917, the Provisional Government changed the statute of the cross allowing its award to junior officers.  When awarded as such, a silver laurel branch device was affixed to the ribbon.  The Cross of St. George was abolished after the Bolshevik  Revolution of 1917, the Order of Glory nominally replaced it during the Soviet Era.

1992 reinstatement

Following the fall of the Soviet Union in 1991, the Cross of St George was reinstated by Decision of the Supreme Soviet of the Russian Federation № 2557-I of March 20, 1992.  Its award criteria were amended twice, first on August 8, 2000 by Presidential Decree 1463 and most recently by Presidential Decree 1099 of 7 September 2010.

The Cross of Saint George is awarded to soldiers, sailors, sergeants, petty officers, warrant officers and junior officers for deeds and distinction in battle in defence of the Fatherland, as well as for deeds and distinction in battle on the territory of other states while maintaining or restoring international peace and security with recognized instances of courage, dedication and military skill. Awarded sequentially in four classes from the fourth to the first for subsequent acts of courage.

The first post reinstatement award ceremony took place in August 2008 to soldiers who displayed courage and heroism during the armed conflict in South Ossetia.  On that day, Russian President Dmitry Medvedev decorated 11 soldiers and sergeants with the Cross of Saint George, fourth class, for courage and heroism displayed in the performance of military duties.  A further 263 servicemen were decorated with the Cross of Saint George for distinction displayed in the Georgia operation.

List of the 11 initial recipients in August 2008:
 Adushkin, Sergei Ravilyevich, junior sergeant
 Alekseev, Sergey Alexandrovich, junior sergeant
 Bazhenov, Taras Germanovich, private
 Kelohsaev, Atsamaz Tamerlanovich, junior sergeant
 Krupchatnikov, Alexander Dmitrievich, private
 Mustafin, Farid Ravkatovich, private
 Nurgaliyev, Nail Ravilyevich, private
 Polushkin, Sergei Nikolaevich, junior sergeant
 Revin, Nikolai Dmitrievich, private
 Suvorov, Dmitry Alexandrovich, private
 Yunusov, Rustam Abdukadirovich, junior sergeant

Russo-Ukrainan War
On New Year 2022, Russian president Vladimir Putin awarded the Cross of St. George to military personnel serving in the war in Ukraine.

Award description
The modern Cross of Saint George is virtually identical to the imperial variant. It is a 34mm wide cross pattée worn on the left side of the chest with other medals, the obverse has a central medallion bearing the right facing image of Saint George on horseback slaying the dragon. The reverse of the central medallion bears the Cyrillic monogram of the Order of Saint George "SG" (Russian: «СГ»). The reverse of the two lateral arms of the cross bear the serial number of the award, the left arm having an embossed letter "N" at its left extremity. The class of the cross is embossed on the reverse of the lower arm, "1-я степ" for the first class, "2-я степ" for the second class, "3-я степ" for the third class and "4-я степ" for the fourth class.

The crosses first and second class are made of gilt silver, the crosses third and fourth class are made of silver.  All four crosses hang from the standard Russian pentagonal mount covered with an overlapping 24mm wide silk moiré ribbon of Saint George.  A bow made of the same ribbon is affixed to the crosses first and third class to distinguish them from the second and fourth class awards.

When the cross is not worn, a ribbon bar is worn on the uniform.  The ribbon bar is 8mm high by 24mm wide, it bears a 7mm high golden metallic Roman numeral denoting the class of the award.

See also
Awards and decorations of the Russian Federation
Order of Saint George
Order of Glory
Ribbon of Saint George

References

External links
 The Commission on State Awards to the President of the Russian Federation

Military awards and decorations of Russia
Courage awards
Awards established in 1992
1831 establishments in the Russian Empire
Orders, decorations, and medals of the Russian Empire
Saint George (martyr)